The 2018 Ottawa Fury FC season is the club's 5th season at the professional level and its 2nd in the United Soccer League.

Squad

Transfers

In

Out

Trial

Friendlies

Pre-season

Mid-season

Friendly statistics

Competitions

United Soccer League

Standings

Results summary

Results by round

Match reports

Canadian Championship

Second qualifying round

Semi-finals

Squad statistics

Appearances and goals

|-

|-

|-

|-

|-

|-

|-

|-

|-

|-

|-

|-

|-

|-

|-

|-

|-

|-

|-

|-

|-

|-

|-

|-

|-
|colspan="14"|Players who appeared for Ottawa but left during the season:
|-

|-

|-

|-

|-

|}

Goal scorers

Clean sheets

Disciplinary

References

Ottawa Fury
Ottawa Fury
2018
Ottawa Fury
2010s in Ottawa